Nicktoons Movin' (known as SpongeBob SquarePants Movin' with friends in PAL regions) is a party video game developed by Mass Media and published by THQ released in 2004. It features characters from the shows SpongeBob SquarePants, Danny Phantom, Rocket Power, The Fairly OddParents, and The Adventures of Jimmy Neutron: Boy Genius. The game requires the EyeToy accessory to play.

Gameplay 
Similarly to other EyeToy minigame compilations, like EyeToy: Play and Sega SuperStars, the gameplay consists of the player moving their upper-body in front of the EyeToy camera to manipulate objects and characters within the thirteen minigames. Before playing a minigame to achieve a high-score, SpongeBob SquarePants and Patrick Star commentate over the menu screens, and video clips from the animated episodes that the minigames are based on are shown. The multiplayer mode allows two to eight players to compete for points between one to thirteen rounds of minigames, with the winner getting to pick the next game and the option to spin a wheel for additional points. While motion controls are required to play the minigames, some menus offer the option to use a standard controller for navigation.

Reception 
IGN gave the game an "Okay" score of 6.0. Official PlayStation Magazine gave the game a 3 out of 5.

References 

2004 video games
Party video games
Crossover video games
Nicktoons video games
PlayStation 2 games
PlayStation 2-only games
The Adventures of Jimmy Neutron: Boy Genius video games
Video games based on The Fairly OddParents
SpongeBob SquarePants video games
Danny Phantom video games
Rocket Power video games
THQ games
Video games developed in the United States
Multiplayer and single-player video games